WCZQ (105.5 FM) is an urban-leaning rhythmic contemporary station serving Champaign, Illinois. WCZQ broadcasts with an ERP of 6 kW and is licensed to Monticello, Illinois. They are owned by Neuhoff Corp., through licensee Neuhoff Media Decatur, LLC. The station has been rhythmic since 2002 and previously targeted Monticello itself with a country music format.

External links
Hot 105.5's website

CZQ
Rhythmic contemporary radio stations in the United States
Radio stations established in 1991
Piatt County, Illinois
Champaign County, Illinois